The Costa Rica national rugby union team represents Costa Rica in international rugby union. The nation have yet to play in a Rugby World Cup tournament. The Costa Rica national rugby team played their first international in 2005 defeating their opponents Panama by 60-0.

In December, 2007, Costa Rica A & B sides participated in the First Central American Rugby cup. The other competing teams were Panama and Guatemala. Costa Rica A came first in this tournament, Panama 2nd, Guatemala 3rd, and Costa Rica B 4th.

In December 2009, Costa Rica hosted the IRB Consur B tournament.  The other competing nations were Colombia, Venezuela, Peru, and Costa Rica.  The final results were Colombia finishing first, Venezuela second, Peru third, and Costa Rica fourth.

After finishing fourth behind Peru, Venezuela and Colombia in the 2010 and 2011 CONSUR B tournaments, Costa Rica played in the newly created CONSUR C tournament in 2012.  They won this tournament, beating Guatemala, Ecuador and El Salvador.

Overall Record

Their Test record against all nations (up to 23 11 2019):

CONSUR C Guatemala 2012
In December 2012, Costa Rica played in the newly created CONSUR C tournament.  They won this tournament, beating Guatemala by 37 to 10, Ecuador by 33 to 8 and El Salvador by 57 to 3.

This unprecedented achievement was the result a hardworking staff and a 5 months preparation during which more than 100 players were called for trials. Coach Francisco José "El Gordo Secret" Galarreta Apaestegui and his manager Wadya "Dr. Evil" Sauma put up a team united by personal sacrifice, friendship and a common dream that lead them into victory. The 2012 Costa Rican rugby union team demonstrated the country's rugby at its best, displaying some players from every union.

The 2012 squad included the following 25: Marco Blanco (Prop, Coronado RC); Guillermo Lavari (Prop, Stags RFC); Jefry Vargas (Prop, Cadejos RC); Marvin Taylor Ebanks (Prop, Montreal Irish RFC, Canada); Claudio Carrizo (Hooker, Stag RFC); Alexis Devitre (Lock, Universitarios Club de Rugby); Meyer Zúñiga Fernández (Lock, Cartago RC); Hugo López Póveda (Lock, Cartago RC); Nicolas Broggi (#8, Universitarios Club de Rugby); Marlon Cerdas Blanco (#8, Coronado RC); Fernando Ramírez Esquivel (Flanker, Wák RC); Pierric Béros (Flanker, Stag RFC); Sebastián Gutiérrez del Valle (Scrum Half, Stag RFC); Leonardo Muñoz Recalde (Scrum Half, Wák RC); Iván Bogantes Miranda (Fly Half, Universitarios Club de Rugby); Ignacio Maqueda (Fly Half, Stag RFC); Lucas Withington (Fly Half/Center, Stag RFC); Rafael Ulloa Beeche (Center, Wák RC); Franklin Zúñiga (Center, Stag RFC); Rafael López Póveda (Full Back, Cartago RC); Ariel Apuy (Full Back, Universitarios Club de Rugby); Juan José Mata Zúñiga (Winger, Universitarios Club de Rugby); Gustavo Patiño (Winger, Cadejos RC); César Salas (Winger, Cadejos RC); Byron Monge Benavides (Winger, Universitarios Club de Rugby).

External links
 Costa Rica on rugbydata.com
 Universitarios Club de Rugby Costa Rica on rugbyuniversitarios.com

Central American national rugby union teams
Rugby union in Costa Rica
National sports teams of Costa Rica